Ditrigona marmorea is a moth in the family Drepanidae. It was described by Wilkinson in 1968. It is found in India (Assam) and China.

The wingspan is 17.5 mm. The fore- and hindwings are lustrous white, the forewings with the costa buff changing to brown at the base. There are pale brownish grey, sub-basal, antemedial, postmedial and dentate subterminal fasciae. The hindwings are as
the forewings but with weak sub-basal fascia.

References

Moths described in 1968
Drepaninae
Moths of Asia